Mikaili Charlemagne (born 1 April 2003) is a Saint Lucian swimmer. Charlemagne represented her country at the 2020 Tokyo Olympic Games in the women's 50 metre freestyle event. She competed in the women's 100 metre freestyle event at the 2017 World Aquatics Championships. In 2019, she represented Saint Lucia at the 2019 World Aquatics Championships held in Gwangju, South Korea. She competed in the women's 50 metre butterfly and women's 100 metre freestyle events.

In Tokyo, Charlemagne finished with a time of 26.99, setting a new national record.

References

External links
 

2003 births
Living people
Saint Lucian female swimmers
Place of birth missing (living people)
Female butterfly swimmers
Saint Lucian female freestyle swimmers
Springfield Pride athletes
Swimmers at the 2020 Summer Olympics
Olympic swimmers of Saint Lucia
Swimmers at the 2022 Commonwealth Games
Commonwealth Games competitors for Saint Lucia